Marie Françoise Ouedraogo (born 3 December 1967) is a Burkinabé mathematician. She has previously served in government as permanent secretary of the national policy of good governance.

Biography
Born in December 1967, Ouedraogo was raised in Ouagadougou. She was drawn to the study of mathematics at a young age as she received good grades without putting forth much effort. She was educated at the University of Ouagadougou, where she wrote her first thesis (“Doctorat de 3ème cycle) on Lie superalgebras in 1999. Akry Koulibaly served as her doctoral adviser. From 2005 to 2008 Ouedraogo served as the permanent secretary of the national policy of good governance. She was committed to ending forms of corruption, especially in the realm of public transport. According to her, good governance is a state of mind. She then prepared a Ph.D. thesis at Blaise Pascal University of Clermont-Ferrand in France under the co-direction of Sylvie Paycha and Akry Koulibaly. Her Ph.D. thesis was about pseudodifferential operators and was accepted in 2009. Ouedraogo is the first Burkinabé woman who defended a thesis in mathematics.

Ouedraogo teaches in the Mathematics Department of the University of Ouagadougou. Her research interests are pseudodifferential operators and superalgebras.

Service
In 2009, she became president of the African Mathematical Union Commission on Women in Mathematics in Africa. The AMUCWMA seeks to get girls in Africa more interested in mathematics and potentially choose it as a career. In October 2012, she co-hosted a workshop with the International Center of Pure and Applied Mathematics (ICPAM) to generate interest in mathematics among African women. On 11 July 2013, Ouedraogo was elected president of the newly formed African Women in Mathematics Association. She gave a talk entitled "Mathematics and Women: Different Regions, Similar Struggles" at the ICWM forum in August 2014.

Publications 
 Extension of the canonical trace and associated determinants, thèse de l'université Blaise Pascal (Clermont-Ferrand II), under the direction of Akry Koulibaly, Sylvie Paycha, 2009.
 On the existence of ad-nilpotent elements, Afrika Matematika (2014), DOI 10.1007/s13370-014-0246-y (with Come Jean Antoine Bere and Nakelgbamba Boukary Pilabre).
 A symmetrized canonical determinant on odd-class pseudodifferential operators, Geometric and topological methods for quantum field theory, 381–393, Cambridge Univ. Press, Cambridge, 2010.
 Uniqueness of traces on log-polyhomogeneous pseudodifferential operators, J. Aust. Math. Soc. 90, No. 2, 171–181 (2011) (with Catherine Ducourtioux).
 The multiplicative anomaly for determinants revisited; locality, Commun. Math. Anal. 12, no 1, 28–63 (2012) (with Sylvie Paycha).
 Classification of traces and associated determinants on odd-class operators in odd dimensions, SIGMA Symmetry Integrability Geom. Methods Appl. 8 Paper 023, 25pp (2012) (with Carolina Neira).
 A symmetrized canonical determinant on Odd-Class pseudodifferential operators
 Supersystèmes triples de Lie associés aux superalgèbres de Malcev, Afrika Matematica (3) 14 (2002), 19–30 (with Akry Koulibaly).
 Super-représentations faibles de superalgèbres de Malcev, Afrika Matematica (3) 14 (2002), 5–17

References

External links

1967 births
Living people
Burkinabé mathematicians
Burkinabé women in politics
People from Ouagadougou
Blaise Pascal University alumni
University of Ouagadougou alumni
Academic staff of the University of Ouagadougou
20th-century mathematicians
21st-century mathematicians
21st-century women politicians
20th-century women mathematicians
21st-century women mathematicians
African women mathematicians
21st-century Burkinabé people